Dichocrocis xanthoplagalis is a moth in the family Crambidae. It was described by George Hampson in 1912. It is found in Nigeria.

References

Endemic fauna of Nigeria
Moths described in 1912
Spilomelinae